Wood carving is a form of woodworking by means of a cutting tool (knife) in one hand or a chisel by two hands or with one hand on a chisel and one hand on a mallet, resulting in a wooden figure or figurine, or in the sculptural ornamentation of a wooden object. The phrase may also refer to the finished product, from individual sculptures to hand-worked mouldings composing part of a tracery.

The making of sculpture in wood has been extremely widely practised, but doesn't survive undamaged as well as the other main materials like stone and bronze, as it is vulnerable to decay, insect damage, and fire.  Therefore, it forms an important hidden element in the art history of many cultures.   Outdoor wood sculptures do not last long in most parts of the world, so it is still unknown how the totem pole tradition developed.  Many of the most important sculptures of China and Japan, in particular, are in wood, and so are the great majority of African sculpture and that of Oceania and other regions.  Wood is light and can take very fine detail so it is highly suitable for masks and other sculpture intended to be worn or carried.  It is also much easier to work on than stone.

Some of the finest extant examples of early European wood carving are from the Middle Ages in Germany, Russia, Italy and France, where the typical themes of that era were Christian iconography. In England, many complete examples remain from the 16th and 17th century, where oak was the preferred medium.

The oldest wood carved sculpture, the Shigir Idol carved from larch, is around 12,000 years old.

Methods and styles
 Chip carving
 Relief carving
 Scandinavian flat-plane

 Lovespoon
 Treen
 Whittling
 Chainsaw carving
 Florentine carving

Techniques
Pattern,
Blocking,
Detailing,
Surfacing,
and Smoothening

Tools

Basic tool set
 the carving knife: a specialized knife used to pare, cut, and smooth wood.
 the gouge: a tool with a curved cutting edge used in a variety of forms and sizes for carving hollows, rounds and sweeping curves.
 the coping saw: a small saw that is used to cut off chunks of wood at once.
 the chisel: large and small, whose straight cutting edge is used for lines and cleaning up flat surfaces.
 the V-tool: used for parting, and in certain classes of flat work for emphasizing lines.
 the U-Gauge: a specialized deep gouge with a U-shaped cutting edge.
 sharpening equipment, such as various stones and a strop: necessary for maintaining edges.

A special screw for fixing work to the workbench, and a mallet, complete the carvers kit, though other tools, both specialized and adapted, are often used, such as a router for bringing grounds to a uniform level, bent gouges and bent chisels for cutting hollows too deep for the ordinary tool.

Wood carving process

Selection
The nature of the wood being carved limits the scope of the carver in that wood is not equally strong in all directions: it is an anisotropic material. The direction in which wood is strongest is called "grain" (grain may be straight, interlocked, wavy or fiddleback, etc.). It is smart to arrange the more delicate parts of a design along the grain instead of across it. Often, however, a "line of best fit" is instead employed, since a design may have multiple weak points in different directions, or orientation of these along the grain would necessitate carving detail on end grain, (which is considerably more difficult). Carving blanks are also sometimes assembled, as with carousel horses, out of many smaller boards, and in this way, one can orient different areas of a carving in the most logical way, both for the carving process and for durability. Less commonly, this same principle is used in solid pieces of wood, where the fork of two branches is utilized for its divergent grain, or a branch off of a larger log is carved into a beak (this was the technique employed for traditional Welsh shepherd's crooks, and some Native American adze handles). The failure to appreciate these primary rules may constantly be seen in damaged work, when it will be noticed that, whereas tendrils, tips of birds beaks, etc., arranged across the grain have been broken away, similar details designed more in harmony with the growth of the wood and not too deeply undercut remain intact.

Probably the two most common woods used for carving in North America are basswood (aka tilia or lime) and tupelo; both are hardwoods that are relatively easy to work with. Chestnut, butternut, oak, American walnut, mahogany and teak are also very good woods; while for fine work Italian walnut, sycamore maple, apple, pear, box or plum, are usually chosen. Decoration that is to be painted and of not too delicate a nature is often carved in pine, which is relatively soft and inexpensive.

Sculpture

A wood carver begins a new carving by selecting a chunk of wood the approximate size and shape of the figure he or she wishes to create or if the carving is to be large, several pieces of wood may be laminated together to create the required size. The type of wood is important. Hardwoods are more difficult to shape but have greater luster and longevity. Softer woods may be easier to carve but are more prone to damage. Any wood can be carved but they all have different qualities and characteristics. The choice will depend on the requirements of carving being done: for example, a detailed figure would need a wood with a fine grain and very little figure as a strong figure can interfere with 'reading' fine detail.

Once the sculptor has selected their wood, he or she begins a general shaping process using gouges of various sizes. The gouge is a curved blade that can remove large portions of wood smoothly. For harder woods, the sculptor may use gouges sharpened with stronger bevels, about 35 degrees, and a mallet similar to a stone carver's. The terms gouge and chisel are open to confusion. Correctly, a gouge is a tool with a curved cross-section and a chisel is a tool with a flat cross-section. However, professional carvers tend to refer to them all as 'chisels'. Smaller sculptures may require the woodcarver to use a knife, and larger pieces might require the use of a saw. No matter what wood is selected or tool used, the wood sculptor must always carve either across or with the grain of the wood, never against the grain.

Once the general shape is made, the carver may use a variety of tools for creating details. For example, a “veiner” or “fluter” can be used to make deep gouges into the surface, or a “v-tool” for making fine lines or decorative cuts. Once the finer details have been added, the woodcarver finishes the surface. The method chosen depends on the required quality of the surface finish. The texture left by shallow gouges gives 'life' to the carving's surface and many carvers prefer this 'tooled' finish. If a completely smooth surface is required general smoothing can be done with tools such as “rasps,” which are flat-bladed tools with a surface of pointed teeth. “Rifflers” are similar to rasps, but smaller, usually double-ended, and of various shapes for working in folds or crevasses. The finer polishing is done with abrasive paper. Large grained paper with a rougher surface is used first, with the sculptor then using finer grained paper that can make the surface of the sculpture slick to the touch.

After the carving and finishing is completed, the artist may seal & colour the wood with a variety of natural oils, such as walnut or linseed oil which protects the wood from dirt and moisture. Oil also imparts a sheen to the wood which, by reflecting light, helps the observer 'read' the form. Carvers seldom use gloss varnish as it creates too shiny a surface, which reflects so much light it can confuse the form; carvers refer to this as 'the toffee apple effect'. Objects made of wood are frequently finished with a layer of wax, which protects the wood and gives a soft lustrous sheen. A wax finish (e.g. shoe polish) is comparatively fragile though and only suitable for indoor carvings.

Traditions
The making of decoys and fish carving are two of the artistic traditions that use wood carvings.

Gallery

See also 

List of woodcarvers
Chainsaw carving
History of wood carving
Woodcut
Woodturning
Woodworking
Wood carving in the Marquesas Islands
 Woodcarved Catholic saints in the Parish Church of Ortisei, northern Italy
National Wood Carvers Association
 Woodcarving events:
Woodfest Wales
Arborglyph, carvings made in the bark of living trees

References

External links

 Woodcarving Magazine
 Best Wood for Carving
 India Tamil Nadu's Thammampatti Wood Carving to get 'Geographical Indication' tag 

 
Woodworking